Live in Stockholm may refer to:

 Live in Stockholm (Don Cherry album), 2013
 Live in Stockholm (Deep Purple album), a 2005 remix of the 1988 album Scandinavian Nights
 Live in Stockholm (Rickie Lee Jones album), 2011
 Live in Stockholm (EP), by John Norum, 1990

See also
 Live in Stockholm 1961, an album by John Coltrane
 Live in Stockholm 1963, an album by John Coltrane
 Live in Stockholm 1977, a 1996 album by Hurriganes
 Live in Stockholm 1994, an album by the Breeders
 Live at Isstadion Stockholm: Wild Frontier Tour, a 1987 video by Gary Moore